Carl Spencer Albert (1962–1995) was an American singer, the lead vocalist of the heavy metal band Vicious Rumors from late 1986 until 1995.  He was a 1975 graduate of Columbia Elementary School in Columbia, Tuolumne County, California, and a 1979 graduate of Sonora High School, Sonora, California, also in Tuolumne County.  He played lead guitar in local bands in Tuolumne County for several years, notably in Crossfire, a hard-rock band, Chaser, another hard-rock band, and Uncle Fester (with bandmate Shon Snyder), a hard-rock band.

He died on April 22, 1995, as a result of a car crash and is buried in the Sonora, California, Catholic Cemetery.

Before joining Vicious Rumors, Albert played with the bands Ruffians, Villain, and Scratch.

In memory of Albert, Vicious Rumors released the CD A Tribute to Carl Albert (including bootleg recordings taken from the last European tour they did together) and the home-video The First Ten Years.

The Vicious Rumors song "Perpetual", included on the Something Burning album (and sung by the leader of the band Geoff Thorpe because "there is no one who can take Carl's place"), was the last track written by Albert.

The guitarist Mark McGee, for one of his solo projects (actually unpublished), composed and recorded the song "Find Your Way Home" dedicated to the memory of his lost friend.

Original VR Bassist Dave Starr's new band WildeStarr, has a song called "Voice in the Silence" dedicated to Albert on their 2010 debut CD Arrival.

Discography

with Vicious Rumors 
 1988 – Digital Dictator
 1990 – Vicious Rumors
 1991 – Welcome to the Ball
 1992 – Plug In and Hang On [Live]
 1994 – Word of Mouth
 1994 – The Voice [EP]
 1995 – A Tribute to Carl Albert [Live]

with Ruffians 
 1984 – Demo [Demo tape]
 1985 – Ruffians [EP]
 2004 – 85 & Live [Best of/Compilation]
 2005 – There & Back [Best of/Compilation]

with Villain 
 1986 – Only Time Will Tell [EP]

with Scratch 
 1986 – Beyond the Fear [Demo tape]

Videography 
 Vicious Rumors – The First Ten Years (VHS)

References

External links 
 Carl Albert on Myspace
 Dave Starr's Vicious Rumors History website - Dave Starr's VR History Site with Carl Albert Memorial

American heavy metal singers
1962 births
1995 deaths
20th-century American singers